Michael Chester Farmer (born 22 November 1944) is an English former professional footballer who played in the Football League for Birmingham City and Lincoln City. He played as a wing half.

Career
Farmer was born in Leicester. He began his football career as an apprentice with Birmingham City in 1961, and turned professional the following year. Described as a "tall, well-built midfielder with a powerful shot", Farmer scored on his debut in the First Division on 1 February 1964, deputising for Malcolm Beard in a 3–2 defeat at Ipswich Town. This proved to be his only first-team appearance for the club, and in the 1965 close season he joined Lincoln City. Farmer spent only one season with Lincoln, playing 22 games, all in the Fourth Division, before moving into non-league football with Skegness Town and Arnold.

Prior to the 1970–71 season he signed for Grantham, then playing in the Midland League. By the time his Grantham career ended some four-and-a-half years and 143 games later, he had won two Midland League titles, a Southern League Division One North title and contributed to the club's Southern League runners-up spot in 1974, though in 1973–74 season he spent time on loan at Oadby Town and took no part in Grantham's run to the Third Round of the FA Cup.

After leaving professional football he worked in finance.

References

External links
Lincoln City details and photo at the Lincoln City FC Archive

1944 births
Living people
Footballers from Leicester
English footballers
Association football wing halves
Birmingham City F.C. players
Lincoln City F.C. players
Skegness Town A.F.C. players
Arnold F.C. players
Grantham Town F.C. players
Oadby Town F.C. players
English Football League players
Midland Football League players
Southern Football League players